László Szigeti (3 August 1957 – 2 February 2022) was a Slovak politician. A member of the Party of the Hungarian Community, he served as Minister of Education from 9 February to 4 July 2006. He died on 2 February 2022, at the age of 64.

References 

1957 births
2022 deaths
20th-century Slovak politicians
21st-century Slovak politicians
Government ministers of Slovakia
Party of the Hungarian Community politicians
Hungarians in Slovakia
People from Komárno District
Members of the National Council (Slovakia) 1994-1998
Members of the National Council (Slovakia) 2006-2010